Coccus longulus, the long brown scale, is a species of soft scale insect in the family Coccidae. It is found in Europe.

References

Further reading

 

Coccidae
Articles created by Qbugbot
Insects described in 1887